Aleksandr Yule'vich Finn-Enotaevsky (1872, Kaunas – 1943) was a Soviet economist.

Finn-Enotaevsky was an active Bolshevik until 1915 when he decided to focus his attention on his career as an academic economist, becoming a professor in the subject. He was on friendly terms with Vladimir Groman and Nikolai Kondratiev.

He was one of the defendants at the 1931 Menshevik Trial. He received a sentence for ten years.

He died in Karagandy Province and was rehabilitated in 1991.

Publications
 The current economy of Russia (1890 - 1910 years) St Petersburg: Semenova, (1911)
 Present Situation of the World Economy, (1920)
 Новые идеи в экономике (New ideas in economics), (1925)
 Finansovy kapital i proizvoditelny, (1926)

References

1872 births
1943 deaths
Writers from Kaunas
People from Kovensky Uyezd
Lithuanian Jews
Russian Social Democratic Labour Party members
Jewish socialists
Soviet economists
1931 Menshevik Trial
Soviet rehabilitations